Nice Try, The Devil is the second album by comedian Pete Holmes. The stand-up TV special was directed by Marcus Raboy and premiered on Comedy Central on May 12, 2013. The album was released digitally on May 14, 2013 by Comedy Central Records.

Track listing

Reception 
Nice Try, The Devil was met with positive reviews. The A.V. Club named it the 6th-best comedy album of 2013, saying that it "builds on what Holmes established with his great 2011 album, Impregnated With Wonder, [where] folks would kill for the kind of guffaws Nice Try, The Devil produces". Paste ranked it as the 10th-best stand-up special of 2013, saying that it "shows off Pete Holmes’ comedic voice hilariously, loudly and undeniably". Consequence of Sound said that it "is a haphazard rodeo molded in the mind of a charismatic optimist [...] There are plenty of laughs, plus a nice dose of weirdness, if you're into that sort of thing".

References

2013 albums
Comedy Central Records albums
2010s comedy albums
Stand-up comedy albums
2010s spoken word albums
Spoken word albums by American artists
Live spoken word albums
Pete Holmes albums